Mariya Sergeyevna Savinova (born 13 August 1985) is a Russian former athlete who specialized in the 800-metres event.  In 2017, she was found guilty of doping and was subsequently suspended from competition for four-years. In addition to the ban, she had three years of elite results nullified and was stripped of both her World Championship medals (2011 and 2013) and her 2012 Olympic gold medal.

Career
Savinova was born in Chelyabinsk. In 2009, she became the European indoor champion in the 800-metres and the World indoor champion (also in the 800 m) one year later. She originally was awarded gold medals at the 2011 World Championships in Daegu,  and the 2012 Olympic Games in London. In 2013, she captured silver in the 800-metres in the World Championships in Moscow.

Doping suspension
In December 2014, in an undercover documentary filmed by a Russian whistleblower which aired on German TV, Savinova admitted to injecting testosterone and using the anabolic steroid oxandrolone. She said, "Oxandrolone is very quickly out of my body again. It takes less than 20 days. We have tested that. My husband has very good contacts at the doping control laboratory."  The footage led to Savinova's blood samples being re-examined and launched an investigation by the World Anti-Doping Agency into Russia. 

In August 2015, the IAAF charged her with doping violations. The case was referred to the Court of Arbitration for Sports (CAS) in 2017.” Not long after, in November 2015, Savinova was one of five Russian runners the World Anti-Doping Agency (WADA) recommended to receive a lifetime ban for doping during the London Olympics, along with Ekaterina Poistogova.

On 10 February 2017, the Court of Arbitration for Sport issued a 43-page opinion which noted that, “It follows from the information and intelligence provided by Ms. Yuliya Stepanova (Savinova's teammate) that the Athlete [Savinova] used prohibited substances over a long period of time." The CAS upheld the four-year ban for Savinova, nullified her results from July 2010 to August 2013, and stripped her of the medals she was awarded during that time, including prize money and appearance fees.

International competitions

See also
List of doping cases in athletics
List of Olympic medalists in athletics (women)
List of stripped Olympic medals
800 metres at the Olympics
800 metres at the World Championships in Athletics
Russia at the World Athletics Championships
Doping at the World Athletics Championships
List of IAAF World Indoor Championships medalists (women)
List of stripped European Athletics Championships medals
List of European Athletics Indoor Championships medalists (women)
List of Russian sportspeople
List of people from Chelyabinsk

References

External links
 
 
 
 
 

1985 births
Living people
Sportspeople from Chelyabinsk
Russian female middle-distance runners
Olympic female middle-distance runners
Olympic athletes of Russia
Athletes (track and field) at the 2012 Summer Olympics
Competitors stripped of Summer Olympics medals
Athletes stripped of World Athletics Championships medals
World Athletics Indoor Championships winners
European Athletics Indoor Championships winners
Russian Athletics Championships winners
European Athlete of the Year winners
Doping cases in athletics
Russian sportspeople in doping cases